The 1913 New York Yankees season was the club's eleventh. This was their first season exclusively using the "Yankees" name. The team finished with a record of 57–94, coming in 7th place in the American League. The team also moved into the Polo Grounds which they would share with the New York Giants until 1923.

Offseason 
 December 20, 1912: Del Paddock was purchased from the Yankees by the Rochester Hustlers.
 December 1912: Guy Zinn was purchased from the Yankees by the Boston Braves.

Regular season

Season summary 
With an otherwise lackluster season, the most noteworthy event for the 1913 Yankees was switching their home field from Hilltop Park to the Polo Grounds. The Yankees had lent their home to the National League's Giants during the rebuilding of the Polo Grounds following its disastrous fire in 1911. The Giants returned the favor in 1913, subleasing to their American League rivals after the Highlanders' agreement to play at the aging, and wooden, Hilltop ballpark had ended.

At that time, the Giants were one of the strongest teams in baseball, winners of two consecutive league championships, and they would win their third in a row in 1913. The Yankees were seen as no threat to their status, and would provide additional revenue. Little did the Giants suspect what the future held for the respective clubs' status in the city and in baseball.

Team name 
The nickname "Yankees" was now in frequent popular usage, and with the move of just a few blocks from the Hilltop to the bottomland of Coogan's Hollow next to the Harlem River, the alternate nickname "Highlanders" no longer made logical sense, and was dropped. Thus "Yankees" became the exclusive nickname of the New York American League franchise.

Season standings

Record vs. opponents

Roster

Player stats

Batting

Starters by position 
Note: Pos = Position; G = Games played; AB = At bats; H = Hits; Avg. = Batting average; HR = Home runs; RBI = Runs batted in

Other batters 
Note: G = Games played; AB = At bats; H = Hits; Avg. = Batting average; HR = Home runs; RBI = Runs batted in

Pitching

Starting pitchers 
Note: G = Games pitched; IP = Innings pitched; W = Wins; L = Losses; ERA = Earned run average; SO = Strikeouts

Other pitchers 
Note: G = Games pitched; IP = Innings pitched; W = Wins; L = Losses; ERA = Earned run average; SO = Strikeouts

Relief pitchers 
Note: G = Games pitched; W = Wins; L = Losses; SV = Saves; ERA = Earned run average; SO = Strikeouts

Notes

References 

New York Yankees team page at www.baseball-almanac.com
1913 New York Yankees at Baseball Reference

New York Yankees seasons
New York Yankees
New York Yankees
1910s in Manhattan
Washington Heights, Manhattan